Rude Dog is a fictional animated white dog originally created by artist Brad McMahon while under contract to Sun Sportswear in the 1980s as part of a line of surfing- and skateboarding-related clothing. As of 30 August 2015, Rude Dog was once again trademarked, this time in the name of original series/character creator Brad McMahon. McMahon also created Rude Dog's gang of canine misfits known as "the Dweebs", as well as Seymour, Rude Dog's nemesis.

Sun Sportswear projects
The character was a stylized version of a Bull Terrier, and the name "Rude" had the dual purpose of glorifying uncalled-for deportment and referring to the rude boy subculture of ska that was popular at the time. The majority of the clothing used angular artwork and neon colors, in keeping with the fashion trend shared by Quiksilver, Vision Street Wear, PCH, and many others.

Rude Dog and the Dweebs

Adult animated series revival
On April 28, 2022, it was announced Rude Dog will be revived as an adult animated series.

Reception
In 2014, listing it among 12 1980s cartoons that did not deserve remembrance, io9 characterized the series as "an animated atrocity", noting that the series appeared to glorify the "rudeness" that was the main character's defining characteristic.

References

External links
Official Rude Dog website

Clothing advertising characters
Dog mascots
Fictional mechanics
Male characters in advertising
Mascots introduced in 1986